This is a list of Directors, appointed by the Dutch West India Company, of the 17th century Dutch province of New Netherland (Nieuw-Nederland in Dutch) in North America. Only the last, Peter Stuyvesant, held the title of Director General. As the colony grew, citizens advisory boards – known as the Twelve Men, Eight Men, and Nine Men – exerted more influence on the director and thus affairs of province.

There were New Netherland settlements in what later became the US states of New York, New Jersey, and Delaware, with short-lived outposts in areas of today's Connecticut, Rhode Island, and Pennsylvania. The capital, New Amsterdam, became the city of New York when the New Netherlanders provisionally ceded control of the colony to the English, who renamed the city and the rest of the province in June 1665.

During the restitution to Dutch rule from August 1673 to November 1674, when New Netherland was under the jurisdiction of the City of Amsterdam, the first Dutch governor, Anthony Colve, was appointed.

List of directors

From 1624–1664

Restoration of the colony, 1673–1674
In 1673, during the Third Anglo-Dutch War, the Dutch were able to recapture New Amsterdam (renamed "New York" by the British) under Admiral Cornelis Evertsen the Youngest and Captain Anthony Colve.  Evertsen renamed the city "New Orange." Evertsen returned to the Netherlands in July 1674, and was accused of disobeying his orders. Evertsen had been instructed not to retake New Amsterdam but instead to conquer the British colonies of Saint Helena and Cayenne (now French Guiana). In 1674, the Dutch were compelled to relinquish New Amsterdam to the British under the terms of the Second Treaty of Westminster.

See also
Joris Andringa
Johan Björnsson Printz
List of colonial governors of Delaware
List of colonial governors of New Jersey
List of colonial governors of New York
Dutch colonization of the Americas
List of mayors of New York City
History of New York City
New Amsterdam judicial system

References

New Netherland
New Netherland
 
Governors of Delaware
Governors of New Jersey
Governors of New York (state)